Femina, Femina Books, was the first feminist British publishing company, co-founded in 1965 by screen writer Muriel Box.

The original board included Vera Brittain, the British writer, feminist and pacifist. The first book published by Femina was The Trial of Marie Stopes written/edited by Muriel Box.

References

External links
Femina Serbia online magazine and portal for woman

Book publishing companies of the United Kingdom
Feminism in the United Kingdom
Feminist book publishing companies
Publishing companies established in 1965